Joe Adams (born January 4, 1944) is an American politician. succeeding Rory Ellinger, as a member of the Missouri House of Representatives, from 2015 to 2019. He was succeeded by Maria Chappelle-Nadal for one term, then after she stepped down, was elected again to his old seat in 2020, taking office in 2021. He is a member of the Democratic Party.

Personal
In 1960s, Adams served in the United States Air Force. He was a history professor at St. Louis Community College–Meramec where he taught American and African-American History for over 30 years.

Adams is a 1962 graduate of DeLaSalle High School. He earned his bachelor's degree in history from the University of Missouri-Kansas City  in 1970 and went on to receive his an MA in urban American history from UMKC as well in 1971.

He has been a member of the following organizations: Missouri Historic Record Commission, Loop Trolley Board of Directors, National League of Cities, Missouri Commission on Intergovernmental Cooperation, Missouri Episcopal Diocese Commission on Ministry Board and Episcopal Cathedral Chapter Board. He served as President of the St. Louis County Municipal League, Missouri Municipal League and the Mayors of Large Cities of St. Louis County.

Adams received a variety of awards, including the Royal Vagabonds African-American Trailblazer Award; the City of University City Meritorious Service Award; the City of University City Gates of Opportunity Service Award; the St. Louis Legend Award; and the Buzz Westfall Award.  In 1998, he was a member of the Leadership St. Louis.

Political career
From 1975 to 1995, Joe Adams served as the Ward 2 Councilman on the City Council of University City, Missouri. In 1995, Adams was elected Mayor of University City. He served as Mayor until 2010. From 2008 to 2009, Adams served as President of the Saint Louis County Municipal League. In 2014, Adams was elected to the Missouri State House of Representatives.

Adams represented District 86, which includes parts of St. Louis County including University City, Pagedale, Vinita Park, Wellston, Vinita Terrace and Hanley Hills in the Missouri House of Representatives. After trying to win the Democratic nomination for state senator in 2018, he ran again for his old seat in the House, winning in 2020.

Electoral history

State Representative

State Senate

Committee membership
	At the beginning of the 2017 legislative session, Adams served on the following committees:

 Local Government – Ranking Minority Member
 Elections and Elected Officials
 Higher Education

References

1944 births
21st-century American politicians
Educators from Missouri
Living people
Democratic Party members of the Missouri House of Representatives
Politicians from Kansas City, Missouri
Politicians from St. Louis County, Missouri
20th-century American people